Statistics of the UAE Football League for the 1989–90 season.

Overview
It was contested by 14 teams, and Al-Shabab (United Arab Emirates) won the championship.

League standings

References
United Arab Emirates - List of final tables (RSSSF)

UAE Pro League seasons
United
1989–90 in Emirati football